Jean-Marie Gourio (born 1956) is a French novelist, humorist and screenwriter. He was born in Nérac, Lot-et-Garonne. He won early fame for his column Brèves de comptoir, published in the satirical magazine Hara-Kiri. Compilations of the columns were published annually, and even adapted for the stage.

Gourio has written several novels, starting with his debut novel Autopsie d’un nain (1987). His 1998 novel Chut! was widely praised and won several literary prizes.

Cinema
Some of his book had been adapted into film.

 2005 : La vie est à nous !, directed by Gérard Krawczyk (adapted from L'eau des fleurs

In 2014, he write the screenplay of Brèves de comptoir with Jean-Michel Ribes.

References

20th-century French novelists
21st-century French novelists
1956 births
French humorists
French male screenwriters
French screenwriters
Living people
People from Nérac
French male novelists
20th-century French male writers
21st-century French male writers
French crime fiction writers
Charlie Hebdo people